Mount Rider is a mountain in the municipality of Frontenac, in Le Granit Regional County Municipality, Estrie, in Quebec, in Canada.

Geography 
The mountain is located in range 4 which leads to lac aux Araignées in the municipality of Frontenac. The Saint John's Chapel is located near its summit at 620 meters above sea level.

Toponymy
The toponym "Mont Rider" was formalized on December 5, 1968 by the Commission de toponymie du Québec.

Notes and references 

Appalachian summits
Summits of Estrie
Le Granit Regional County Municipality
Mountains of Quebec under 1000 metres